Jagat Bahadur Sunar Bishwakarma is a Nepali politician, member of the Nepal House of Representatives and the minister for Youth and Sports. He is a member of the ruling Nepal Communist Party (NCP), and was elected to the House of Representatives from Kaski-3 constituency.

References

Living people
Nepal MPs 2017–2022
Nepal Communist Party (NCP) politicians
Communist Party of Nepal (Unified Marxist–Leninist) politicians
1974 births